The Dally M Medal is awarded each year (annually) to the player voted for as the 'Player of the year' over the National Rugby League (NRL) regular season. The awards are named in honour of Australian former rugby league great Herbert Henry "Dally" Messenger. The award has existed since 1979, but has only been adopted as the official award for the Player of the Year in the NRL since 1998. Prior to that the official Player of the Year, in both the New South Wales and the Brisbane Rugby Leagues, received the Rothmans Medal whilst the Dally M Medal was awarded by the Daily Mirror newspaper.

Voting
After each game, rugby league sports commentators vote to award three votes to the best player, two votes to the second-best player, and one vote to the third-best player. Additionally, a player will lose three votes for each week of suspension that he incurs during the season. The votes for each round are made public up to Round 12 (26-round season), then are kept secret; this allows the final winner to be kept secret until the Dally M Awards ceremony.

History

Rothmans Medal

The Rothmans Medal was the first official player-of-the-year award to be established in rugby league in Australia. The medal was sponsored by Rothmans, Benson & Hedges Inc., a tobacco production company. There were two Rothmans Medals awarded each year: one for the best player in the New South Wales Rugby League, and one for the best player in the Brisbane Rugby League. The voting for the Rothmans Medal was the same basic format as the modern day Dally M, except that the votes were determined by the referees, rather than the media.

The two Rothmans Medals were first awarded in 1968, and were awarded each year until 1996. In 1997, the Rothmans Medal in New South Wales became known as the Provan-Summons medal, because all tobacco advertising and sponsorship was prohibited in Australia in 1992, under the Tobacco Advertising Prohibition Act 1992; the medal then disappeared altogether in 1998 with the merger of the Australian Rugby League and the Australian Super League. The Queensland Rothmans Medal was also last awarded in 1996, as the Queensland Cup superseded the Brisbane Rugby League as Queensland's premier rugby league competition in 1997.

Dally M Medal
The Dally M Medal was named after Henry Herbert 'Dally' Messenger, who was instrumental in the establishment of rugby league football in Australia. The award was originally established in 1979 by The Daily Mirror newspaper in 1979. For many years, it was the second major individual award in the New South Wales Rugby League behind the Rothmans Medal. It was awarded each year between 1979 and 1996. With the Super League schism in 1997, the medal was not awarded.

Since the National Rugby League (NRL) was formed from the merger of the Australian Rugby League and the Australian Super League in 1998, the Dally M Medal has been the single official player-of-the-year award for that league, and the highest individual honour in Australian rugby league. The medal is awarded, usually by the Australian Prime Minister, at the annual Dally M Awards night where as well as honouring the player of the year, the NRL recognises the premier player in each position, the best coach and the most outstanding rookie of the season.

The medal was notably not awarded in 2003, with the players association threatening to boycott the event during a pay dispute with the league. This backfired badly on the players, with the league responding by swiftly cancelling the event. Penrith's Craig Gower, who led by one vote entering the final round and was unofficially considered man of the match in the final round, is the player thought to have missed out on winning the award as a result.

Venues and Broadcasters

Dally M Medal winners

Multiple winners
The following players have won the Dally M Medal multiple times.

Wins by Club

 No award in 1997 and 2003
 Multiple winners in 2014 and 2016

See also

Dally M Awards
Clive Churchill Medal
Man of Steel Award
Brownlow Medal

References

External links
Rothmans Medal at qrl.com.au
Dally M Medla at hunterlink.net.au

Rugby league trophies and awards
National Rugby League
Awards established in 1980
1980 establishments in Australia
Australian sports trophies and awards
 

fr:Dally M Medal